Julio García Fernández (born 2 May 1965), sometimes known as just Julio, is a Spanish retired footballer who played as a central defender.

Club career
Born in Seville, Andalusia, Julio graduated with Real Betis' youth setup. He made his senior debuts with the reserves in 1982, in Tercera División.

Julio made his first team – and La Liga – debut on 1 April 1984, coming on as a late substitute in a 1–0 away win against RCD Mallorca. After being subsequently demoted back to the B-team, he was loaned to Segunda División's Recreativo de Huelva in the 1986 summer.

After returning from loan Julio was definitely promoted to the main squad, and was an ever-present figure in 1987–88. He scored his first professional goal on 6 January 1991, netting his side's only in a 1–1 draw at CD Tenerife.

In the 1993 summer, after being deemed surplus to requirements by manager Sergije Krešić, Julio left the Verdiblancos and moved to Real Murcia in the second level. After one year as a starter, he joined UD Almería, representing the side in the same division but also in Segunda División B.

Julio eventually hang up his boots in 1998, aged 32.

References

External links
 
 Beticopedia profile 

1965 births
Living people
Spanish footballers
Footballers from Seville
Association football defenders
La Liga players
Segunda División players
Segunda División B players
Tercera División players
Real Betis players
Recreativo de Huelva players
Real Murcia players
UD Almería players